American Samoa competed at the 2015 Pacific Games in Port Moresby, Papua New Guinea from 4 to 18 July 2015. American Samoa listed 91 competitors as of 4 July 2015. Four competitors were qualified in two sports.

Basketball

American Samoa qualified men's and women's basketball teams (total of 24 players):

Men
 Shane Letuu Dennis Ah Ping
 Frankie Sefulu Eteuati
 Earvin Magic Leiato
 Taele Jacob Leota
 Veresa Luvu Jr
 Paul Luamata Mccoy
 William James Mccoy
 Shaun Tuiaana Salavea
 Talanoa Arthur Smith
 Fitimauea Kerisiano Talaeai
 Desmond Taotofi
 Pele P J Tui Jr

Women
 Desiree Ale
 Kristen Ale
 Rheina Tapunia Ale
 Teriana Anastasia Iafeta
 Destiny King
 Anne Falahola Mendoza
 Tipesa Mercedes Moorer
 Valentine Nikkithia Talamoni
 Cecilia Rosary Taufaasau
 Hotia Mary Vaaimamao
 Kadrenna Fuafanua Gaylyne Velega
 Margaritta Manuialeolaga Viena

Beach volleyball

American Samoa qualified six athletes in beach volleyball:

Men
 Sigalu Aitui
 Myles Tupu Muagututia
 Gustiano Tony Tuaniga

Women
 Jane Vaialae Croson
 Latoya Marshall
 Nora Sharma Tuioti-Mariner

Bodybuilding

American Samoa qualified three athletes in bodybuilding:

Men
 Stallone Sinbad Nua
 Lucky Luciano Tran

Women
 Ursula Fitimafa Teo Martin

Boxing

American Samoa qualified one athlete in boxing:

Men
 George Alfred Tanoa Jr

Golf

American Samoa qualified seven athletes in golf:

Men
 Pemerika Gillet
 Tulele T Laolagi
 Faalialia Mauigoa
 Kevin Maukoloa
 Sagapolutele Pelefoti
 Faasoasoaagatumua Carl Viena

Women
 Margaret Tupito Ruth Walker Gadalla

Softball

American Samoa qualified a women's softball team  (16 players):

Women
 Angela Suiavaoalii Ah Fook
 Bernadette Faatalaleleiga Crichton
 Musu Noekaralani Ifopo
 Denitra Sevenlittlesisters Langkilde
 Deborah Gabrielle Malauulu
 Faatupu Ravenmarie Malauulu
 Hannah Amuia Malauulu
 Rowena Mamea
 Deja Janet Irene Nua
 Sweetheart Natalie Nua
 Kelly Kelana Sailimalo Osterbrink
 Jennifer Lorna Pen-Afalava
 Danielle Hana Sagiao
 Sydnee Agnes Samoa
 Fiapaipai April Siatuu
 Jewel Fineole Savanah Vaka

Swimming

American Samoa qualified three athletes in swimming:

Men
 Daniel Tamatoa Hardman
 William Tairiata Hardman

Women
 Tilali Rose Leslie Scanlan

Tennis

American Samoa qualified seven athletes in tennis:

Men
 Christian Martin Duchnak
 Valentine Paul Fuji
 Larry John Vert Vigas Magalasin
 Kevin Jeffrey Maukoloa

Women
 Charity Murrieta Sagiao
 Kalani Pisi Soli
 Florence Wasko

Volleyball

American Samoa qualified men's and women's volleyball teams in volleyball (22 players):

Men
 Sigalu Aitui
 Sigalu Selefuti Aitui
 Junior Faalologo
 Sam Samasoni Luaiva
 Jasper Aaron Mikaele
 Bob Stanley
 Tautua Suapusi
 Faaleo Tevaga
 Gustiano Tony Tuaniga
 Michael Lee Tuimavave
 Donovan Tupuola

Women
 Jane Vaialae Croson
 Norene Moe Iosia
 Saitaua Maureen Iosia
 Litara Susitina Keil
 Inutiraha Uluvao Malina Leau
 Latoya Marshall
 Rachelle Malia Suaava
 Leilia Tafvoyana Toomalatai
 Noralia Jilainique-Lagi Toomalatai
 Pati Tuimavave
 Nora Sharma Tuioti-Mariner

Weightlifting

American Samoa qualified six athletes in weightlifting:

Men
 Tanumafili Jungblut
 Malaki Atonio Jr Sitagata
 Apineru Vaoga

Women
 Monica Taumulioalii Afalava
 Jennade Ferline Ausage
 Orepa Rosery Talo

Notes

References

2015 in American Samoan sports
Nations at the 2015 Pacific Games
American Samoa at the Pacific Games